A bicycle safety wing is an arm attached to the side of a bicycle. Its purpose is to keep other vehicles from passing too closely.

It is usually made of bright plastic, and ends with a reflector.

Legality 
French law allows for bicycle safety wings up to 40 centimetres.

See also 

 Bicycle-friendly
 Bicycle helmet laws by country
 Bicycle safety
 Outline of cycling
 Safety in numbers
 Vehicular cycling

References 

Cycling safety